The V. R. Coss House is a historic house in Muskogee, Oklahoma.  It was listed on the National Register of Historic Places in 1984.

Its walls are brick, laid in running bond.

It was built in 1906 by Virgil R. Coss, an early banker and real estate dealer in Muskogee. The house consists of 3 stories with a partial basement. The first level is predominantly made of quarter-sawn oak while the second level is made of maple. The home has the original stairway as well as a smaller servant stairway which had initiated at the butler's pantry. The butler's pantry was recently combined with the original kitchen to make a larger modern kitchen. The original dining room was fashioned after a railway dining car, so done because of Mr. Coss's close friendship with George Pullman.

References

External links 
Historic Homes of Muskogee Oklahoma
Photograph of Virgil R. Coss House

Houses on the National Register of Historic Places in Oklahoma
Oklahoma culture
Houses completed in 1906
Houses in Muskogee County, Oklahoma
National Register of Historic Places in Muskogee County, Oklahoma
1906 establishments in Indian Territory